A "Pathan joke" is a derogatory joke that is typically centered around ethnic stereotypes about Pashtun people. The word "Pathan" (as opposed to the endonym "Pakhtun") is a Hindi word and it refers to Pashtuns or people who have Pashtun ancestry. Pathan jokes are controversial and are often considered racist, offensive or inappropriate by many in Pakistan and Afghanistan..

See also
Hindu joke
Sardarji joke

References

Pakistani humour
Pashtun culture
Ethnic jokes
Racism in Pakistan
Pashtun society
Desi culture